Elina Svitolina was the defending champion, but lost to Aliaksandra Sasnovich – in a repeat of the previous year's final – in the second round.

Karolína Plíšková won the title, defeating Lesia Tsurenko in the final, 4–6, 7–5, 6–2.

Seeds
The top two seeds received a bye into the second round.

Draw

Finals

Top half

Bottom half

Qualifying

Seeds

Qualifiers

Qualifying draw

First qualifier

Second qualifier

Third qualifier

Fourth qualifier

External links
 Main draw
 Qualifying draw

Women's Singles 2019
2019 WTA Tour